Pingshi may refer:

Places
 Pingshi, Lechang (坪石镇), Guangdong, China
 Pingshi, Tongbai County (平氏镇), in Tongbai County, Henan

Works
 Pingshi, a Ming dynasty treatise on flower arrangement.